Workup may refer to:

Workup (chemistry), manipulations carried out after the main chemical reaction to secure the desired product
Workup, a game of practice baseball (see scrub baseball)